Dadoychus flavocinctus is a species of beetle in the family Cerambycidae. It was described by Chevrolat in 1833. It is known from Brazil.

References

Hemilophini
Beetles described in 1833